Diana Jean Kinloch Beck (29 June 1900 – 3 March 1956) was an English neurosurgeon and possibly the first female neurosurgeon. She established the neurosurgery service at Middlesex Hospital in London, where she gained a public profile for operating on A. A. Milne.

Early life and education
Diana Beck was born in 1900 in Hoole, Chester, to James Beck, a tailor, and Margaret Helena Kinloch. She attended The Queen's School before studying medicine at the London School of Medicine for Women, where she won two prizes and a scholarship. After graduating in 1925, she worked at the Royal Free Hospital as a house surgeon and then a surgical registrar throughout the 1930s.

Medical career 
She chose to specialise in neurosurgery and trained under Hugh Cairns at the Radcliffe Infirmary in Oxford, where she also acted as a general surgeon providing treatment to injured soldiers during the war. In 1939, she was awarded the William Gibson Research Scholarship for Medical Women by the Royal Society of Medicine, and used the grant to undertake research in Oxford with Dorothy Stuart Russell. Using animal experiments, they investigated the causes of idiopathic intracranial hypertension and experimented with various graft materials for cranioplasty.

Beck was appointed consultant neurosurgeon at the Royal Free in 1943, but the next year the ongoing war forced her to move to Chase Farm Hospital and Bristol to provide neurosurgical advice to the emergency medical service for south-west England. She became a consultant neurosurgeon at Middlesex Hospital in 1947, making her the first female consultant at a London teaching hospital that did not admit women students. At Middlesex, she was the first woman and the first neurosurgeon on staff, as well as being the only consultant neurosurgeon in western Europe and North America at the time. Beck set up and ran the neurosurgery service at Middlesex, and published important research on the management of intracerebral haemorrhage. In 1952 she received attention in the press for performing surgery on A. A. Milne, the author of Winnie-the-Pooh, two months after he suffered a stroke. The Times praised her "remarkable piece of surgery", but Milne's biographer Ann Thwaite claimed that the surgery left him "partly paralyzed" with a "distinct change in character"; he died three years later.

Beck suffered from myasthenia gravis and underwent a thymectomy in 1956 to treat a myasthenic crisis. She died at the Middlesex Hospital soon after the procedure from a pulmonary embolism on 3 March 1956. She is commemorated with a plaque in the Fitzrovia Chapel, part of the Middlesex Hospital.

First female neurosurgeon
A 2008 profile in Neurosurgery credits Beck as the world's first female neurosurgeon. The claim has also been made for the Romanian Sofia Ionescu, although the author notes that Ionescu only finished medical school in 1945, when Beck was already working as a consultant in neurosurgery.

References

1900 births
1956 deaths
English neurosurgeons
People from Chester
People educated at The Queen's School, Chester
Alumni of the London School of Medicine for Women
Women neurosurgeons
Deaths from pulmonary embolism
20th-century surgeons